The 2015–16 Southern Miss Lady Eagles basketball team represented the University of Southern Mississippi during the 2015–16 NCAA Division I women's basketball season. The Lady Eagles, led by twelfth year head coach Joye Lee-McNelis, play their home games at Reed Green Coliseum and were members of Conference USA. They finished the season 14–16, 7–11 in C-USA play to finish in a 3 way tie for eighth place. They lost in the first round of the C-USA women's tournament to UAB.

Roster

Rankings

Schedule

|-
!colspan=9 style="background:#F1C500; color:#000000;"| Exhibition

|-
!colspan=9 style="background:#F1C500; color:#000000;"| Non-conference regular season

|-
!colspan=9 style="background:#F1C500; color:#000000;"| Conference USA regular season

|-
!colspan=9 style="background:#F1C500; color:#000000;"| Conference USA Women's Tournament

See also
2015–16 Southern Miss Golden Eagles basketball team

References

Southern Miss Lady Eagles basketball seasons
Southern Miss